Alejandro Reyes is a Swiss-Chilean singer and songwriter. He released his debut studio album Alejandro Reyes in September 2015. In January 2018, he was confirmed as one of the artists for ESC 2018 – Die Entscheidungsshow.

Early life
Reyes was born in Chile, but due to a medical issue during his birth he was left with a disability in his left hand, but that did not stop him from playing the guitar and creating music. He moved to Switzerland at the age of ten and began his musical career when a friend gave him a guitar. He gets inspiration for his songs from real life situations.

Career

2013–16: Early beginnings and Alejandro Reyes
He released his debut single, "Lovely Season" on 11 February 2013. In 2014, he took part in season 3 of the French television series The Voice: la plus belle voix. In the blind auditions, he sang "Wake Me Up!" by Avicii, he was eliminated with no coach pressing their button. He released "The Only One" as the lead single from his debut album on 27 April 2015. His self-titled debut studio album was released on 25 September 2015 by HitMill Records. The album peaked at number 36 on the Swiss Albums Chart. On 21 October 2015, he released the single "Momento" with Snook, Make Plain and Anna. The song peaked at number 13 on the Swiss Singles Chart. The same year Alejandro was an opening act for Johny Halliday at Arena de Geneve.

On 8 January 2016, he released the single "Malaika".

2017–present: Eurovision Song Contest

In 2017 Alejandro Reyes signs with a Swiss independent record label The Hana Road Music Group.

On 9 January 2018, he was confirmed as one of six acts taking part in ESC 2018 – Die Entscheidungsshow, the Swiss national final that will select Switzerland's entry for the Eurovision Song Contest 2018, he will sing "Compass", he co-wrote the song with Laurell Barker and Lars Christen. He also features as one of the songwriters of Naeman's song "Kiss Me". The show took place on 4 February 2018 at SRF's Studio 1 in Zürich, hosted by Sven Epiney. The winning entry was determined by a 50% public televote and 50% international jury vote.  Alejandro finished in second place behind eventual winners Zibbz. In October Alejandro releases single "Solamente" that becomes the "Song of the Day" on one of the biggest Swiss radio stations SRF3.

In 2019 Alejandro becomes a part of the Coca-Cola Music Squad together with Bastian Baker, Loco Escrito and other Swiss singers for Coca-Cola's campaign in Switzerland.  The same year he collaborates with AXA Insurance and Iceberg clothing brand.

Up until 2021 Alejandro releases a few singles in a row in collaboration with other Swiss singers. November 2019, he collaborates with a Dutch platinum-awarded DJ Justin Prime.  His following collaborations include an Israeli star DJ Malka, Swiss singers LEROCQUE and El Tiger. In 2020 Alejandro releases a single in collaboration with his Eurovision colleagues, Swiss band Timebelle.

Discography

Albums

Singles

References

Swiss male singers
Living people
1992 births